Pseudochalceus is a genus of characins from freshwater habitats in western Ecuador and western Colombia.  Currently, four species in this genus are described:
 Pseudochalceus bohlkei Orcés-V. (es), 1967
 Pseudochalceus kyburzi L. P. Schultz, 1966
 Pseudochalceus lineatus Kner, 1863
 Pseudochalceus longianalis Géry, 1972

References
 

Characidae
Fish of South America